Sibilla Di Vincenzo (born 22 January 1983) is a racewalker who won a silver medal with the Italian team at the European Race Walking Cup.

Achievements

National titles
She won 10 time the national championships.
 Italian Athletics Championships
 5 km walk: 2005, 2008, 2009, 2010 (4)
 20 km walk: 2010, 2016 (2)
 Italian Athletics Indoor Championships
 3000 m walk: 2010, 2011, 2016, 2017 (4)

See also
 Italian team at the running events
 Italy at the European Race Walking Cup

References

External links
 

1983 births
Living people
Italian female racewalkers
Sportspeople from the Province of Chieti
People from Lanciano